Odontotaenius striatopunctatus is a beetle of the Family Passalidae. It is found in Latin America.

References

Passalidae
Beetles described in 1835
Beetles of South America